The 1972 Air Canada Silver Broom was held at the Olympic Eisstadion in Garmisch-Partenkirchen, Germany from March 19–21, 1972. The 1972 Air Canada Silver Broom was the site of the infamous incident that led to the Curse of LaBonte.

Teams

*Throws second rocks.

Standings

Round-robin results

Draw 1

Draw 2

Draw 3

Draw 4

Draw 5

Draw 6

Draw 7

Tiebreaker

Playoffs

Semifinals

Final

The Curse of LaBonte

The 1972 Air Canada Silver Broom saw the incident which led to the Curse of LaBonte. In the finals, Canada under Meleschuk was playing the Americans under LaBonte, and Canada was down by two points in the final end. Meleschuck had the hammer and tried to hit out an American stone on the button so that Canada could take two and tie the game. The rock succeeded in knocking out the American stone, but rolled so that it came to be very close to another American rock biting the 8-foot. US third Frank Aasand saw that the American rock was still second shot and jumped in the air to celebrate. LaBonte also followed suit, but slipped and kicked the Canadian stone while Canadian third Dave Romano was still investigating the shot. It was decided that Canada got two points in the 10th end, forcing an extra end in which Canada stole a point and won.

It was said that LaBonte placed a curse on Canada, which did not win a world championship until 1980.

References

External links

World Men's Curling Championship
Air Canada Silver Broom, 1972
Air Canada Silver Broom, 1972
Curling competitions in West Germany
International sports competitions hosted by West Germany
March 1972 sports events in Europe
1972 in Bavaria
Sport in Garmisch-Partenkirchen
Sports competitions in Bavaria